The Urban Water Journal is a peer-reviewed scientific journal covering topics related to water systems in the urban environment. It was established in 2004 and is published by Taylor & Francis in association with the International Association for Hydro-Environment Engineering and Research. The editors-in-chief are David Butler (University of Exeter), Alberto Campisano (University of Catania), Christos Makropoulos (National Technical University of Athens), and Čedo Maksimović (Imperial College London).

Abstracting and indexing
The journal is abstracted and indexed in EBSCO databases, ProQuest databases, Science Citation Index Expanded, Scopus, Aquatic Sciences and Fisheries Abstracts, Inspec, Metadex, and GEOBASE. According to the Journal Citation Reports, the journal has a 2020 impact factor of 2.081.

References

External links

Taylor & Francis academic journals
Publications established in 2004
10 times per year journals
English-language journals
Engineering journals